Juul Frost Arkitekter (JFA), often styled Juul | Frost Arkitekter, is a Danish architectural firm headquartered in Copenhagen, Denmark. A branch office, JFA Studio , is located in Malmö, Sweden.

History
Juul Frost Arkitekter was founded in 1990 by Helle Juul and Flemming Frost.  The firm opened an office in Malmö in 2012.

Søren Arildskov joined the firm as partner in 2014 and Søren Askehave became partner in 2017. Hanna Svensson, Line Stybe Vestergaard and  Philip Krogh became asspcoated partners in 2016.

Selected projects
 Max Bank, Næstved, Denmark )2012)
 Media Evolution City, Malmö, Sweden (2012)
 DTU Skylab, Technical University of Denmark, Copenhagen, Denmark (2015)
 Campus Örebro/Nova House, Örebro University, Örebro, Sweden (2015)
 Sjöjungfrun, Malmö, Sweden (2016)
 Northern Harbour, Sønderborg, Denmark (2016)

References

Rxternal links
 Official website

Architecture firms of Denmark
Architecture firms based in Copenhagen
Companies based in Copenhagen Municipality
Design companies established in 1990
Danish companies established in 1990